Somalia Report is a news service that focuses on working with Somali journalists and international experts to provide news, insight and non-partisan coverage.

The internet-based information network began in 2011 and now works with over 110 local Somali journalists to gather news and information to create the region's only 24/7 news cycle.
 	
Somalia Report provides local news with exclusive insider coverage of piracy, al Shaabab, clandestine operations, back room politics along with in-depth analysis.
  	
The editor is Canadian author Jay Bahadur who wrote Pirates of Somalia.
 	
Publisher and founder Robert Young Pelton is also the author of The World's Most Dangerous Places, and has created similar ground network driven sites during the height of the conflict in Iraq, Afghanistan and Pakistan.

References

News agencies based in Somalia
Mass media in Somalia